The Avenue M station (formerly South Greenfield, Elm Avenue), is a local station on the BMT Brighton Line of the New York City Subway. It is located in Midwood, Brooklyn, at Avenue M between East 15th and East 16th Streets. The station is served by the Q train at all times.

History

The station originated as the South Greenfield grade station of the Brooklyn, Flatbush and Coney Island Railroad (BF&CI). The line opened in 1878, and South Greenfield was one of the original stations. It also had a connection to the Long Island Rail Road Manhattan Beach Branch. Through a series of bankruptcies, buyouts, and mergers, the BF&CI became the Brooklyn and Brighton Beach Railroad (B&BB, 1887), Brooklyn Rapid Transit (BRT, 1900), Brooklyn-Manhattan Transit (BMT, 1923), New York City Rapid Transit (1940), New York City Transit Authority (1953), and the Metropolitan Transit Authority (1968). Through all the ownership and management changes, station name changes, and reconstruction of this portion of the line from grade to elevated embankment, the station was never shut, and has been in near-continuous operation for close to 150 years. However, the present structure was only built when the line was elevated onto the embankment, between 1903 and 1907. The station was later known as Elm Avenue.

This station underwent reconstruction from September 2009 to December 2011. Both of the station's platforms were rebuilt with new edges, windscreens, and canopies.

Station layout

Situated on an elevated embankment, Avenue M station has two side platforms and four tracks. The side tracks provide the local service to this station, while the two center tracks, used by the B express train on weekdays, bypass the station. This layout, as well as many other station features, closely resemble many other local stations on the elevated portion of the line, especially the Avenue J station.

The 2011 artwork here is called Hare Apparent by Rita MacDonald. It is installed on the walls of the Coney Island-bound platform's staircase and consists ceramic tiling and glass mosaic depicting various species of birds and rabbits.

Exits
The station house is a brick building underneath the tracks. The entrance to the station house is in line with the storefronts of the south side of Avenue M. There is access from the north side of Avenue M to the Manhattan-bound platform, and although there is a stairway on the Coney Island-bound platform leading to the north side of the street, it is closed.

The Coney Island-bound platform has a double wide staircase going down to the station house while the Manhattan-bound platform has a narrow staircase going down there and a bank of turnstiles leading to another staircase that goes down to the north side of Avenue M. The Coney Island-bound staircase's landing has two exit-only turnstiles leading directly to the street.

Nearby locations
Just west of the station, at Locust Avenue and East 14th Street, is the former location of American Vitagraph, a prolific movie studio that produced silent movies from the turn of the 20th century until 1925, when it was purchased by Warner Bros. A smokestack bearing "Vitagraph Co." can still be seen from the station.

Edward R. Murrow High School is located just to the northeast adjacent to the line.

References

External links 

 
 Station Reporter — Q Train
 The Subway Nut — Avenue M Pictures 
 Avenue M entrance from Google Maps Street View
 Platforms from Google Maps Street View

M
New York City Subway stations in Brooklyn
Railway stations in the United States opened in 1908
1908 establishments in New York City
Midwood, Brooklyn